Nayaganaipriyal is a village in the Udayarpalayam taluk of Ariyalur district, Tamil Nadu, India.

Demographics 

As per the 2001 census, Nayaganaipriyal had a total population of 3940 with 1906 males and 2034 females.

Rajaraman won the 2022 Local Panchayath By-election president post.

References 

Villages in Ariyalur district